Peoria Union Station was a passenger rail hub for north-central Illinois, in Peoria, Illinois. Built in the Second Empire architecture style, it was located on Depot Street, between State and Oak Streets, near the Illinois River. At its peak, it had seven tracks operating. However, even by World War II, it was only a junction point for regional lines that seldom extended beyond the state of Illinois. This station, the Rock Island Depot and the Illinois Terminal (for an interurban line) reached their peak volume of trains in 1920 with 110 trains running in and out daily. 

Tenant railroads in the middle of the 20th Century included the Burlington Route, the New York Central Railroad (the legacy routes of the Cleveland, Cincinnati, Chicago and St. Louis Railway, also known as the 'Big Four') and New York, Chicago & St. Louis (Nickel Plate Road).

The Alton Railroad, Chicago & Illinois Midland, Chicago & North Western, Illinois Central Railroad, Pennsylvania Railroad and Toledo, Peoria & Western used the station until the 1930s. Into the latter 1940s the Burlington Route's motor coach trains ran from the station to Galesburg, Illinois. The Nickel Plate ran a train to Lima, Ohio via Bloomington, Illinois, Lafayette, Indiana and Frankfort, Indiana.

More significant long distance train routes bypassed Peoria and went through Galesburg, Illinois to the northwest and Bloomington, Illinois to the southeast, and the station had an early decline. The station was last used in 1955, and was destroyed by fire 1961. The last Nickel Plate train from the station was a local train to Frankfort in 1951. In 1955 Burlington shifted its trains to a separate station northeast of Union Station until it discontinued Peoria trains in 1960. New York Central in 1955 moved its Peorian (Peoria-Bloomington-Champaign-Urbana-Danville-Indianapolis) trains out of Union Station to nearby Pekin, and with the shift, renamed the train, Corn Belt Special, until ending passenger service in 1957.

Notes

Buildings and structures in Peoria, Illinois
Former railway stations in Illinois
Railway stations in the United States opened in 1882
Railway stations closed in 1955
Transportation buildings and structures in Peoria County, Illinois 
Peoria, Illinois
Historic district contributing properties in Illinois
Former Chicago and Alton Railroad stations
Former New York, Chicago and St. Louis Railroad stations
Former Chicago and North Western Railway stations
Former Illinois Central Railroad stations
Former New York Central Railroad stations
Former Pennsylvania Railroad stations
Former Toledo, Peoria, and Western Railway stations